Storthoaks is a village in the Canadian province of Saskatchewan within the Rural Municipality of Storthoaks No. 31 and Census Division No. 1. The village is located approximately 129 km east of the City of Estevan on Highway 361 and 16 km west of the Saskatchewan-Manitoba border.

History 
Storthoaks incorporated as a village on June 5, 1940.

Demographics 

See also 

 List of communities in Saskatchewan
 Villages of Saskatchewan
 Block settlement

Footnotes

Villages in Saskatchewan
Storthoaks No. 31, Saskatchewan
Division No. 1, Saskatchewan